Michael Finucane (1922 – 5 July 2016) was an Irish Gaelic footballer who played as a left corner-back and left wing-back for the Kerry senior team.

Born in Lisselton, County Kerry, Finucane first played competitive Gaelic football in his youth. He came to prominence with his local club Ballydonoghue before later enjoying championship success with the Shannon Rangers divisional team.

Finucane made his senior debut during the 1946-47 league. He went on to play a brief role for Kerry on the left-hand-side flank, and won one Munster medal. He was an All-Ireland runner-up on one occasion.

As a member of the Munster inter-provincial team on a number of occasions, Finucane won one Railway Cup medal. Throughout his inter-county career he made 5 championship appearances. Finucane retired from inter-county football following the conclusion of the 1950 championship.

Honours

 Shannon Rangers
 Kerry Senior Football Championship (1): 1945

 Kerry 
 Munster Senior Football Championship (1): 1947

 Munster
 Railway Cup (1): 1949

References

1922 births
2016 deaths
Ballydonoghue Gaelic footballers
Kerry inter-county Gaelic footballers
Munster inter-provincial Gaelic footballers